Elections to the Manipur Legislative Assembly were held in February 2000, to elect members of the 60 constituencies in Manipur, India. The Manipur State Congress Party won the most seats as well as the popular vote, and Wahengbam Nipamacha Singh was re-appointed as the Chief Minister of Manipur.

After the passing of The Delimitation of Parliamentary and Assembly Constituencies Order, 1976, the constituencies were set to the ones used in this election.

Result

Elected Members

See also 
 List of constituencies of the Manipur Legislative Assembly
 2000 elections in India

References

Manipur
2000
2000